Frank Varey (31 March 1908 in Eldwick, England – February 1988 in Sheffield, England) was a former international speedway rider who featured in the Speedway World Championship finals in 1937 and 1938. He also featured in two Star Riders' Championships, the forerunner to the World Championship, in 1932 and 1933.

Career summary

Rider
Varey began his speedway career competing in open meetings in 1928 before signing for the Belle Vue Aces who had joined the newly formed Northern League in 1929. Varey began succeeding quickly but had a reputation of being a hard, uncompromising rider which often led him to disciplinary problems with speedway authorities, confrontations and occasional scuffles with other riders and on several occasions needing police escorts from stadiums after on-track action upset the home fans at other tracks.

During the winter of 1929-1930, Varey rode in meetings in Argentina, where the local fans gave him the nickname of El Dibalo Rojo (The Red Devil) which further established his tough image even further.

Varey was very successful at Belle Vue. After being made captain in 1931 following the retirement of his friend and rival Arthur Franklyn, the team won the National League Championship four seasons in a row from 1933 to 1936 and were leading in the 1939 season until it was abandoned due to the outbreak of World War II. The Aces also won the National Trophy in those same four seasons.

Varey was selected to ride for England in the first ever Ashes Test Match series against Australia and was awarded the captaincy in the test held at Belle Vue.

He continued to ride during the war and in 1944 won the British Wartime Championship.

Promoter
At the end of 1945 he decided to retire from racing and began promoting speedway at the Owlerton Stadium in Sheffield, staying as promoter of the Sheffield Tigers until 1950 before a spell promoting the Edinburgh Monarchs. Varey restarted speedway at Sheffield in 1960 in the Provincial League and remained until ill health forced him to relinquish control.

Varey returned to Belle Vue as team manager following the death of Dent Oliver the previous year but despite ongoing health problems he still helped with track preparation at Sheffield.

Varey died in February 1988.

World Final Appearances
 1937 -  London, Wembley Stadium - 15th - 3pts + 8 semi-final points
 1938 -  London, Wembley Stadium - 17th - 0pts + 4 semi-final points

Players cigarette cards
Varey is listed as number 46 of 50 in the 1930s Player's cigarette card collection.

References 

1908 births
1988 deaths
British speedway riders
English motorcycle racers
Belle Vue Aces riders
Speedway promoters